1905-06 was Ethnikos' first season of organised football, competing in the very first Panhellenic Championship, in which the club came first.

Friendlies

Panhellenic Championship

Intercalated Games

All matches

Squad

Appearances and goals include the Panhellenic Championship, Olympic Games and friendly matches, of which statistics are known.

References
 RSSSF
 Empros Newspaper, 4 April 1906 (Page 4, Greek)

1905–06 in Greek football